The Chilean Patagonia wildfire was a wildfire affecting Patagonia Park in Aysén Region, southern Chile. The fire begun on Friday July 2, 2021 around  22:00 local time. It was expected that incoming rain would help mitigate the fire. ,  have burnt. National Office of Emergency of the Interior Ministry declared the fire a "red alert" emergency on July 3, 2021. By July 7 the fire was "under control but not yet extinguished".

An investigation found out that the fire started when strong winds (120 km/h) caused the chimney flue of a stove to collapse. This happened in a centre for Darwin's rhea reproduction. Two rheas suffered injuries as a result of the fire.

See also
2017 Chile wildfires
Drought in Chile

References

2021 in Chile
July 2021 events in South America
Wildfires in Chile
History of Aysén Region
Chilean Patagonia
July 2021 events in Chile
2021 fires in South America